The Grace Church Complex, saw its 175th anniversary in 2019, is a historic Episcopal church complex in Massapequa, Nassau County, New York.  The complex consists of the church, surrounding parish cemetery, the Floyd-Jones family cemetery, and the DeLancey Floyd-Jones Free Library.  The small church was built in 1844 by Elbert Floyd-Jones and remodeled in 1905.  It is a frame structure on a brick foundation and consists of a vestibule, nave, and chancel.  It is in the Gothic Revival style and features a square bell tower with modest spire.  The church also has Tiffany glass windows added during the remodeling. Sometime after 1983, the old Grace Church was given to the Historical Society of the Massapequas.

The DeLancey Floyd-Jones Free Library was built in 1896 and is a two-by-two-bay one-room structure that served as the only public library in Massapequa for 60 years.  The library was founded and built by DeLancey Floyd-Jones (1826–1902). Initially, the library, which Col. Floyd-Jones gave to Massapequa along with an endowment, was open three days a week and had enough space on its shelves to accommodate up to 2,500 books.

It was listed on the National Register of Historic Places in 1983.  It also includes two structures that are Oyster Bay municipal landmarks.

References

External links

Grace Episcopal Church of the Episcopal Diocese of Long Island website
The Delancey Floyd-Jones Free Library

Churches on the National Register of Historic Places in New York (state)
Libraries on the National Register of Historic Places in New York (state)
Gothic Revival church buildings in New York (state)
Churches completed in 1844
19th-century Episcopal church buildings
Churches in Nassau County, New York
National Register of Historic Places in Oyster Bay (town), New York
Library buildings completed in 1896
1844 establishments in New York (state)